Ministry for the Environment may refer to:
 Ministry for the Environment (Hungary)
 Ministry for the Environment (Iceland)
 Ministry for the Environment (New Zealand)
 Ministry for the Environment (Chile)